Johannes Gigas (22 February 1514 — 12 July 1581) was a German Protestant theologian, hymn writer, educator and Reformer. Gigas was born in Nordhausen, Thuringia and died in Schweidnitz (now Świdnica, Silesia, Poland).

The libretto of Ach, lieben Christen, seid getrost, BWV 114, a chorale cantata by  Johann Sebastian Bach, was based on "Ach lieben Christen seid getrost", a hymn text by Gigas.

Literature 

 Julius Köstlin: Die Baccalaurei und Magistri der Wittenberger philosophischen Facultät 1538–154 und die öffentlichen Disputationen derselben Jahre. Halle: Niemeyer, 1890, p. 12

References

External links 
 
 Johannes Gigas (Hymn-Writer) bach-cantatas.com

1514 births
1581 deaths
16th-century German Protestant theologians
German Protestant Reformers
People from Nordhausen, Thuringia
German male non-fiction writers
16th-century German male writers